is the name of several mountains in Japan including:

Mount Mikuni (Hokkaidō), in the Ishikari Mountains in Hokkaidō
Mount Mikuni (Gifu), any one of three mountains in Gifu Prefecture